Sobasina magna is a species of jumping spider.

Name
The epitheton magna "large" refers to the fact that S. magna is the largest Sobasina species (7mm) yet known.

Distribution
Sobasina magna is only known from Tonga.

References
  (1998): Salticidae of the Pacific Islands. III.  Distribution of Seven Genera, with Description of Nineteen New Species and Two New Genera. Journal of Arachnology  26(2): 149-189. PDF

Salticidae
Endemic fauna of Tonga
Spiders of Oceania
Spiders described in 1998